This is a list of episodes of the Japanese anime adaptation of Hayate the Combat Butler. The first season of the anime aired on TV Tokyo in Japan from April 1, 2007 through March 30, 2008, consisting of 52 episodes. The series was animated by SynergySP and directed by Keiichiro Kawaguchi. Animax Asia teamed up with Red Angel Media and dubbed the anime in English. Animax aired their English adaption between June 11 and August 21, 2009. A 25-episode second season animated by J.C.Staff and directed by Yoshiaki Iwasaki aired in Japan between April 4 and September 18, 2009, which was preceded by an original video animation (OVA) episode in March 2009. The second season was aired on Animax Asia dubbed in English from July 21 to October 13, 2010.

In 2011, Manglobe released a film and in 2012 produced a third anime series titled Hayate the Combat Butler: Can't Take My Eyes Off You which is not a direct continuation of the previous two. Rie Koshika presented the scripts for the anime and also handled the character designs. The series aired 12 episodes from October 3 through December 20, 2012 and depicted a story which was not published in the manga. The third season was dubbed in English and aired on Animax Asia from June 26 to July 11, 2013. A fourth anime series titled Hayate the Combat Butler: Cuties, again produced by Manglobe and directed by Masashi Kudo, aired 12 episodes between April 8 and July 1, 2013. The fourth season was dubbed in English and aired on Animax Asia from April 11 to April 29, 2014.

The first anime series has two opening themes and four ending themes. The second anime series has two opening themes and two ending themes. The first opening theme is "Wonder Wind" by Elisa and the second opening theme is "Daily-daily Dream" by Kotoko. The first ending theme is "Honjitsu, Mankai Watashi Iro!" by Shizuka Itō (with Eri Nakao, Sayuri Yahagi and Masumi Asano) and the second ending theme is "Karakoi: Dakara Shōjo wa Koi o Suru" by Rie Kugimiya and Ryoko Shiraishi.

Overview
{| class="wikitable"
|-
! style="padding:0 8px" colspan="2" rowspan="2"| Series
! style="padding:0 8px" rowspan="2"| Episodes
! colspan="2"| Original run
! colspan="2"| English run
|-
! Series premiere
! style="padding:0 8px"| Series finale
! Series premiere
! style="padding:0 8px"| Series finale
|-
 |style="background:#000;"|
 |Hayate the Combat Butler
 |52
 |style="padding:0 8px;"|
 |style="padding:0 8px;"|
 |style="padding:0 8px;"|
 |style="padding:0 8px;"|
|-
 |style="background:#000;"|
 |Hayate the Combat Butler!!
 |25+1
 |style="padding:0 8px;"|
 |style="padding:0 8px;"|
 |style="padding:0 8px;"|
 |style="padding:0 8px;"|
|-
 |style="background:#000;"|
 |Hayate the Combat Butler: Can't Take My Eyes Off You
 |12
 |style="padding:0 8px;"|
 |style="padding:0 8px;"|
 |style="padding:0 8px;"|
 |style="padding:0 8px;"|
|-
 |style="background:#000;"|
 |Hayate the Combat Butler: Cuties
 |12
 |style="padding:0 8px;"|
 |style="padding:0 8px;"|
 |style="padding:0 8px;"|
 |style="padding:0 8px;"|
|-
 |style="background:#000;"|
 |—
 |102
 |—
 |—
 |—
 |—
|}

Hayate the Combat Butler (2007–2008)
The anime series was released in Japan in a set of 13 DVD compilation volumes between July 25, 2007, and July 25, 2008. On June 11, 2009, Animax Asia started broadcasting the anime on their South East and South Asia channels with English dubbing done by Red Angel Media. The anime airing on Animax Asia uses the censored version of the anime and some of the characters in the English dub speak with accents. On September 28, 2009, QTV 11 started the Filipino dub of this anime; it was second in Southeast Asia. TVB Jade also started the Cantonese dub of this anime. The series was licensed in North America by Bandai Entertainment in 2008, but in February 2012, the company stopped releasing titles beyond February 7, and in April of the same year, the rights to the series were dropped, making the releases out of print. Sentai Filmworks has since licensed the series for digital and home video release.

There is some censorship that is intended as a joke as in any given instance of Hayate bleeding being censored by a sign reading "can't show this". The anime, like the manga, has references to other anime as well as some original references such as bleeping out words. This method of censoring references has followed the English translation of the manga. The DVD contains two audio tracks: one track contains the original audio and edits aired on TV Tokyo and the other track removes the bleeping and other edits. Bandai Entertainment had announced plans to retain this for their English dub, using the Japanese audio tracks in such instances. Throughout the anime, the audience can see some of the characters breaking the fourth wall. The narrator is seen talking with Hayate at times, and this makes Hayate realize that there is an audience. Most of the cast have references to their voice actor's previous roles (Nagi for example has an eyecatch where she wears the outfit of Louise's uniform in Zero no Tsukaima).

Before and after the commercial break, there is a unique eye-catcher each time. The characters who appear state a phrase which is an ongoing game of shiritori. Starting with episode six, a small segment began playing after the ending credits called the "Butler Network" featuring Hayate, Nagi, and sometimes a guest. It is meant to cover the animation production, broadcast dates, advertise character song albums and DVDs, and follow Hayate's endeavors in fighting against evil as he becomes a great butler.

Hayate the Combat Butler!! (2009)

Hayate the Combat Butler: Can't Take My Eyes Off You (2012)

Hayate the Combat Butler: Cuties (2013)

References

External links

Episodes
Hayate the Combat Butler